Gretta Taslakian (born 16 August 1985) is a Lebanese sprinter of Armenian descent who specializes in the 200 metres. She is the first Lebanese woman to participate in two and three Olympic Games. Gretta is the current Lebanese national record holder in the outdoor 100 meters, 200 meters and 400 meters and indoor 60 meters and 200 meters. She was also a member of the record holding team in the outdoor 4x100 meter relay and 4x400 meter relay.

Biography
She was born in Ghadir, Lebanon, to Lebanese-Armenian parents.

She competed at the 2001 World Championships, the 2003 World Indoor Championships and the 2004 World Indoor Championships. She set a new national record in the women's 200 metres at the 2004 Summer Olympics, but came in last in her preliminary heat and did not advance.

She competed at the 2006 Asian Games in the 200 meters, but was eliminated in the first heat. Taslakian won two gold medals for Lebanon in the 2007 Pan Arab Games in Cairo, Egypt. She also competed at the 2007 World Championships without success.

She competed in the 2008 Summer Olympics representing Lebanon. At the first round of the 200 metres, Gretta came in last in her heat as she ran in a time of 25.32 seconds, which was her season best, but not enough to qualify to the next round.

She came in eighth place at the 2010 Asian Indoor Athletics Championships in the 60 meters. She also came in fourth place at the 2010 Asian Games in 200 meters. She also competed at the 2011 Pan Arab Games, winning a silver medal in the 100 metres and a gold medal in the 200 metres. Taslakian won a silver medal in the 200 metres at the 2011 Asian Athletics Championships.

At the 2012 Summer Olympics, she again came in last in her heat, and did not qualify from her heat.

References

External links

1985 births
Living people
Lebanese female sprinters
Athletes (track and field) at the 2004 Summer Olympics
Athletes (track and field) at the 2008 Summer Olympics
Athletes (track and field) at the 2012 Summer Olympics
Olympic athletes of Lebanon
Athletes (track and field) at the 2002 Asian Games
Athletes (track and field) at the 2006 Asian Games
Athletes (track and field) at the 2010 Asian Games
Asian Games competitors for Lebanon
Lebanese people of Armenian descent
World Athletics Championships athletes for Lebanon
Olympic female sprinters